Der Emes (in Yiddish:  , meaning 'The Truth', from ) was a Soviet newspaper in Yiddish. A continuation of the short-lived Di varhayt, Der Emes began publishing in Moscow on August 8, 1918. The publisher was the Central Committee of the Russian Communist Party (Bolsheviks). Moishe Litvakov was its editor-in-chief from 1921 until his arrest in the fall of 1937; after that, the newspaper was headed by an anonymous "editorial board". From January 7, 1921 to March 1930 Der Emes appeared as the organ of the Central Bureau of Yevsektsiya. In January 1939 the campaign against Yiddish culture in the USSR became widespread, and Der Emes was liquidated.

Featured highlights
Der Emes was a conductor of the Soviet propaganda and ideas directed at ordinary Jews in the USSR and all around the world.

The most prominent line of the newspaper was the struggle against antisemitic occurrences in the USSR and the Russian Diaspora. Since 1933 there was a continuous blaming of racism in Germany under Hitler.

The last but not least topic was the promotion of Soviet Jewish proletarian culture in Yiddish that ranged from the Jewish Settlement to Yiddish theatres. And of course there was encounter with other Jewish ideological rivals (the Bund, Zionism etc.), which offered their ways to solve the Jewish question.

References

See also
History of the Jews in Russia and Soviet Union
Yevsektsiya
Jewish Bolshevism
Esther Frumkin

Jewish anti-Zionism in Russia
Jewish anti-Zionism in the Soviet Union
Jews and Judaism in Moscow
Yiddish communist newspapers
Propaganda in the Soviet Union
Secular Jewish culture in Europe
Yiddish-language mass media in Russia
Newspapers published in Moscow
Publications established in 1918
Publications disestablished in 1939